Valeriu Traian Frențiu (25 April 1875 – 11 July 1952) was the Bishop of the Eparchy of Oradea Mare of the Romanian Greek Catholic Church from 1922 to his death in 1952.  His beatification occurred on 2 June 2019.

Life and career

His father was a priest named Joachim and his mother was named Rozalia.

He studied theology in Budapest (1894–1898), and in 1902 he received his Ph.D. in Theology.

The Greek-Catholic clergy

He was ordained a priest on 28 September 1898. He worked at the Diocese of Lugoj as rector, dean of Drastic, chancellor and vicar apostolical.

Greek Catholic Bishop

On November 4th,1912, he was appointed bishop of Lugoj at age 37. On 25 February 1922, Frentiu was transferred to Oradea and mounted on 3 May that year.

On September 5th, 1937, the church dedicated Madaras, and consecrated the church in Istria and Greek-Catholic Bocsa on September 8th of that same year.

After the death of Bishop Alexander Niculescu in 1941, Frentiu was moved to the position of Apostolic Administrator of the Archdiocese of Alba Iulia and Fagaras, ministering here throughout the war. In 1947, he returned to Oradea.

Under communist persecution

In Oradea he was arrested on October 28th, 1948 and went into camp at Dragoslavele, and then the refusal to pass the Romanian Orthodox Church in February 1949, was taken to the monastery Căldăruşani.

At Căldăruşani, Valeriu Traian Frenţiu consecrated Bishop Bishop, underground, on John Chertes the night of Christmas of 1949.

End of life

In 1950, he arrived at Sighet Prison, where, after two years, unable to bear the hardness of extermination regime, he died on July 11th, 1952. Other bishops also dead in Sighet, was buried in one night, without a coffin in a mass grave in the Cemetery of the Poor. His grave was leveled to obscure his burial place and to avoid pilgrimages to the graves of the martyrs killed in Sighet.

There has been tried and convicted. In 2011, the City Council decision Resita Dr. Valeriu Traian Frenţiu Martyr Bishop was elected Honorary Citizen of Resita Post Mortem, a town that Frenţiu was born.

Beatification
On 19 March 2019, Pope Francis approved the beatification of Frenţiu and six other Greek-Catholic bishops killed by the communist regime in Romania in the mid-20th century. Pope Francis personally presided over the beatification of Frențiu and the other six bishops at Liberty Field in Blaj, Romania on 2 June 2019.

Gallery

References

Bibliography
Ioan M. Bota, Istoria Bisericii universale și a Bisericii românești de la origini până în zilele noastre, Casa de Editură „Viața Creștină”, Cluj-Napoca, 1994. 
Ioan Ploscaru, Lanțuri și Teroare, Editura Signata, Timișoara, 1993,

External links

 Cei 12 Episcopi Martiri: PS Valeriu Traian Frentiu
 Catholic Hierarchy: Bishop Valeriu Traian Frentiu
 Episcopia de Oradea Mare
  România liberă, din 10 ianuarie 2011 (on-line): Claudiu Pădurean, Episcopul care a adus teleschiul

1875 births
1952 deaths
People from Reșița
Beatifications by Pope Francis
Romanian Austro-Hungarians
Romanian Greek-Catholic bishops
Romanian beatified people
Romanian anti-communist clergy
19th-century Romanian people
20th-century Romanian people
Inmates of Sighet prison
Romanian people who died in prison custody
Prisoners who died in Securitate custody
Delegates of the Great National Assembly of Alba Iulia
Eastern Catholic bishops in Romania